Azad Bon (also Romanized as Āzād Bon; also known as Āzād Bon Maḩalleh) is a village in Siyahrud Rural District, in the Central District of Juybar County, Mazandaran Province, Iran. At the 2006 census, its population was 622, in 164 families.

References 

Populated places in Juybar County